The following list includes settlements, geographic features, and political subdivisions of Arizona whose names are derived from Native American languages.

Listings

Counties

 Apache County – named after the Apache people.
 Shared with cities of Apache Junction, Fort Apache and Apache Lake.
 Cochise County – named after the eponymous Chiricahua chief, from k'uu-ch'ish, meaning "oak".
 Coconino County – named after the extinct Coconino tribe, of which the Havasupai are descended from.
 Gila County – from the Yuma phrase hah-quah-sa-eel, meaning "salty running water".
 Shared with the city of Gila Bend, and the Gila River.
 Maricopa County – named after the Maricopa people.
 Shared with the city of Maricopa, and the village of Maricopa Colony.
 Mohave County – named after the Mohave people.
 Shared with the villages of Fort Mohave, Mohave Valley, and Mojave Ranch Estates.
 Navajo County – named after the Navajo people.
 Shared with Navajo Springs.
 Pima County – named after the Pima people.
 Shared with the city of Pima.
 Yavapai County – named after the Yavapai people.
 Yuma County – named after the Yuma people.
 Shared with the city of Yuma.

Settlements

 Ak Chin – from the O'odham phrase 'akĭ-ciñ, whose English translation is unclear.
 Shared with the village of Ak Chin in Pinal County, or the Ak-Chin Village, also in Pinal County.
 Chilchinbito – from the Navajo phrase tsiiłchin bii' tó, whose English translation is unclear.
 Cibecue – from the Apache phrase deshchíí'bikǫ, meaning "horizontal red canyon". 
 Dennehotso – from the Navajo phrase deinihootso, whose English translation is unclear.
 Huachuca City
 Kaibito – from the Navajo phrase k'ai'bii'tó, whose English translation is unclear.
 Kinlichee – from the Navajo phrase kin dah lichi'i, meaning "red house up at an elevation".
 Lake Havasu City
 Lake Montezuma
 Mesquite Creek
 Nazlini – from the Navajo phrase nazlini, meaning "flowing in a crescent shape".
 Peoria
 Sahuarita
 Tsehili – from the Navajo phrase tseehyili, meaning "flowing into the rocks".
 Tucson – from O'odham cuk ṣon, "black base".
 Shared with the cities of South Tucson and Corona de Tucson, as well as the village of Tucson Estates.
 Tusayan

Bodies of water

 Hasbidito Creek – from a Navajo phrase meaning "dove spring".
 Kinnikinick Lake
 Lake Bekihatso – from the Navajo phrase be'e k'id hatsoh, meaning "big pond".
 Segetoa Spring – from the Navajo phrase tsiyi't ohi, meaning "spring in the forest".
 Setsiltso Spring – from the Navajo phrase chech'il tsoh, meaning "big oak".
 Zuni River – named after the Zuni people.

Other

 Bakulai Mesa – from the Navajo phrase baa lo'k'aa'i, meaning "a place with reeds in it".
 Bitsihutios Butte – from the Navajo phrase bitsu'h hwits'os, meaning "tapered formation at its base".
 Canyon de Chelly
 Chinde Mesa
 Chinle
 Chusca Mountains
 Kin Tiel
 Klagetoh
 Lukachukai Mountains
 Tunitcha Mountains – from the Navajo phrase tontsaa, meaning "big water".

See also
List of place names in the United States of Native American origin

References

Citations

Sources

 
 Bright, William (2004). Native American Placenames of the United States. Norman: University of Oklahoma Press. .

 
History of Arizona
Place names
Native American history of Arizona